Modena is a railway station serving the city of Modena, in the region of Emilia-Romagna, northern Italy. The station opened in 1859 and is located on the Milan–Bologna railway, Verona–Modena railway and Modena–Sassuolo railway. The train services are operated by Trenitalia and Ferrovie Emilia Romagna.

The station is currently managed by Rete Ferroviaria Italiana (RFI). However, the commercial area of the passenger building is managed by Centostazioni. Each of these companies is a subsidiary of Ferrovie dello Stato (FS), Italy's state-owned rail company.

Location
Modena railway station is situated at Piazza Dante Alighieri, to the north of the city centre.

History
The station was opened on 21 July 1859, together with the rest of the Piacenza–Bologna section of the Milan–Bologna railway.

Features

Passenger building

The passenger building is not the original structure dating from when the station began operations.  That building was demolished and rebuilt in 1920.

The present passenger building is rectangular in shape and is made of brick.  It is painted yellow, and consists of three parts.  The central part is spread over three floors, with access provided through five arches on each side of the building.  On the first floor of this part, there are many rectangular mullioned windows decorated with a cornice.

The two lateral parts of the building extend symmetrically from the central body.  They are on two levels, with seven arches at ground floor level, and many windows (similar to those of the central body) at first floor level.

The entrances of all three parts of the building are protected from the weather by a wrought iron canopy, both on the front side and the platform side.

Renovations
Between 2005 and 2006, the station was the subject of extensive renovations commissioned by Centostazioni, with co-financing from RFI.  The total expenditure on the renovations was €700,000.

The renovation work included maintenance of the exterior facade of the passenger building, the shelter and pedestrian underpass, upgrading of technological systems, construction of a new basement, the renovation of public conveniences, and renewal of lighting both internally and externally.

Also included in the renovation project was the construction of new commercial premises, such as a Chef Express bar and a McDonald's.  These two areas alone have about 40 employees, a turnover of €2.5 million, around 500,000 customers per year, and two rental areas of 360 sqm, offering a total of about 130 seats.

Station yard
The station yard has seven tracks, including five through tracks equipped with platforms:

 Track 1 is a loop siding, used for any overtaking of even numbered trains.
 Track 2 is one of the main lines, used for even numbered stopping Trenitalia trains.
 Track 3 is the other main line, used for odd numbered stopping Trenitalia trains.
 Track 4 is a loop siding, used for any overtaking of odd numbered trains.
 Track 5 is used by trains terminating in Modena.
 Tracks 6 and 7 are used by Ferrovie Emilia Romagna trains operating on the Modena–Sassuolo line.

All tracks have a platform sheltered by a canopy, and connected with the other platforms by the pedestrian underpass.

There are other tracks used for storage of the machinery used for line maintenance, and also a repair shop.

Train services

The station is served by the following service(s):

High speed services (Frecciarossa) Milan - Parma - Bologna - Florence - Rome
High speed services (Frecciabianca) Milan - Parma - Bologna - Ancona - Pescara - Foggia - Bari - Brindisi - Lecce
High speed services (Frecciabianca) Milan - Parma - Bologna - Ancona - Pescara - Foggia - Bari - Taranto
High speed services (Frecciabianca) Turin - Parma - Bologna - Ancona - Pescara - Foggia - Bari - Brindisi - Lecce
Intercity services Milan - Parma - Bologna - Florence - Rome - Naples - Salerno - Lamezia Termi - Reggio Calabria
Intercity services Milan - Parma - Bologna - Rimini - Ancona - Pescara - Foggia - Bari - Brindisi - Lecce
Intercity services Milan - Parma - Bologna - Rimini - Ancona - Pescara - Foggia - Bari - Taranto
Night train (Intercity Notte) Turin - Milan - Parma - Reggio Emilia - Florence - Rome - Salerno - Lamezia Terme - Reggio di Calabria
Night train (Intercity Notte) Milan - Parma - Bolgona - Ancona - Pescara - Foggia - Bari - Brindisi - Lecce
Express services (Regionale Veloce) Piacenza - Parma - Reggio Emilia - Bologna - Rimini - Ancona
Express services (Regionale Veloce) Milan - Piacenza - Parma - Reggio Emilia - Bolgona (- Rimini)
Regional services (Treno regionale) Parma - Reggio Emilia - Modena - Bologna
Local services (Treno regionale) Mantova - Suzzara - Carpi - Modena
Local services (Treno regionale) Sassuolo - Modena

Passenger and train movements

The station has about 6.5 million passenger movements each year.

The passenger trains calling at the station include regional, express, InterCity, InterCity Night, Frecciabianca services, and a daily pair of Frecciarossa high speed trains.

A total of about 257 passenger trains serve the station each day.  Their main destinations are Piacenza, Suzzara and Bologna Centrale.

See also

History of rail transport in Italy
List of railway stations in Emilia-Romagna
Rail transport in Italy
Railway stations in Italy
Bologna metropolitan railway service

References

External links

This article is based upon a translation of the Italian language version as at January 2011.

Railway Station
Railway stations in Emilia-Romagna
Railway stations opened in 1859